The 5th Utah Senate District is located in Salt Lake County, Utah. The current State Senator representing the 5th district is Karen Mayne. Mayne was appointed to the Utah Senate on January 16, 2008, to fill a seat that was recently vacated when her husband Senator Ed Mayne died. Mayne won her re-election bid on November 4, 2008, against Republican candidate Jonathan Fidler and Constitution candidate James E. Peverelle, Jr.

History

The 2001 Utah State Legislature passed legislation redistricting Utah's Senate Districts. This legislation took effect during the 2002 General election and Ed Mayne became the Senator for the current 5th Senate District. Prior to the 2002 General Election he represented Senate District 11 from 1995 to 2002.

Ed Mayne died on Sunday, November 25, 2007. His wife Karen Mayne was appointed to replace him.

Previous Utah State Senators (District 5)

Election results

2008 General Election

2006 General Election

Current Candidates

Note: See footnote for candidate listing guidelines.

|}

See also

 Karen Mayne
 Utah Democratic Party
 Utah Republican Party
 Utah Senate

References

External links
 Utah Senate District Profiles
 Official Biography of Karen Mayne
 Samuel Fidler 2010 campaign website

05
Salt Lake County, Utah